Discaria is a genus of 6 species of flowering plants in the family Rhamnaceae, native to temperate regions of the Southern Hemisphere, in Australia, New Zealand and South America.

They are deciduous thorny shrubs or small trees growing to 2–5 m tall. They are also non-legume nitrogen fixers.

Many of the world's Discaria species qualify as xerophytes in the true sense of the term, and the Australian species are no exception. They frequently occur on porous or well-drained sites and on soils of low fertility. Some species can fix nitrogen from the atmosphere with the help of symbiotic bacteria (Frankia) that form nodules in their roots.

Taxonomy

Species
Discaria comprises the following species:
 Discaria americana Gillies & Hook.
 Discaria articulata (Phil.) Miers

 Discaria chacaye (G.Don) Tortosa

 Discaria nitida Tortosa
 Discaria pubescens (Brongn.) Druce

 Discaria toumatou Raoul

Hybrids
The following hybrid has been described:
 Discaria × serratifolia Benth. & Hook.f. ex Mast.

Species names with uncertain taxonomic status
The status of the following species and hybrids is unresolved:
 Discaria × andina (Miers) Speg.
 Discaria aphylla Meyen
 Discaria parviflora Hook.f.
 Discaria pauciflora Hook.f.
 Discaria weddeliana (Miers) Escal.

References

External links 

 
Rhamnaceae genera